Pezzaze (locally ) is a comune in the province of Brescia, in Lombardy. Neighbouring communes are Bovegno, Tavernole sul Mella and Pisogne.

References